A "cerebral rubicon" in paleontology is the minimum cranial capacity required for a specimen to be classified as a certain paleospecies or genus.  The term is mostly used in reference to human evolution.  

The Scottish anthropologist Sir Arthur Keith set the limit at 750 cc for the genus Homo.<ref
name=dirt/> The minimum cranial capacity for the species Homo sapiens is generally set at 900cc.<ref
name=dirt/>

One of the reasons for the proposal to exclude Homo habilis from the genus Homo, and renaming it as "Australopithecus habilis", is the small capacity of their cranium (363cc -600 cc).

Origin
The term is most likely a reference to the Rubicon river, which in the time of the Roman Empire marked the border between Cisapline Gaul and Italy proper.  Crossing the river with an army, as Julius Caesar did in 49 B.C., was illegal by Roman law and is commonly seen as the "point-of-no-return" for Caesar's revolution.  As such, a "rubicon" can  be used idiomatically as any strict dividing line or point-of-no-return.

See also 
Microcephaly

References

External links
The Human Brain: Its Size and Its Complexity

Anthropology